The 1936 Albanian National Championship was the sixth season of the Albanian National Championship, the top professional league for association football clubs, since its establishment in 1930.

Overview
It was contested by 8 teams, and KF Tirana won the championship.

League standings

Results

References
Albania - List of final tables (RSSSF)

Kategoria Superiore seasons
1
Albania
Albania